Chipchase is a surname. Notable people with the name include:

Bill Chipchase (1885–1941), Canadian ice hockey player
Graham Chipchase (born 1963), British businessman
Ian Chipchase  (born 1952), English field athlete
Jack Chipchase (born 1945), Canadian ice hockey player and coach
Jan Chipchase, founder of Studio D Radiodurans
Lyn Bell (now Lynette Chipchase) (born 1947), Australian freestyle swimmer